This is a list of award winners and league leaders for the Oakland Athletics professional baseball franchise.

American League Most Valuable Player
See: Kenesaw Mountain Landis Most Valuable Player Award
Eddie Collins (1914)
Mickey Cochrane (1928)
Lefty Grove (1931)
Jimmie Foxx (1932, 1933)
Bobby Shantz (1952)
Vida Blue (1971)
Reggie Jackson (1973)
José Canseco (1988)
Rickey Henderson (1990)
Dennis Eckersley (1992)
Jason Giambi (2000)
Miguel Tejada (2002)

American League Cy Young Award
See: Cy Young Award
Vida Blue (1971)
Catfish Hunter (1974)
Bob Welch (1990)
Dennis Eckersley (1992)
Barry Zito (2002)

American League Rookie of the Year
See: Jackie Robinson Rookie of the Year Award
Harry Byrd (1952)
José Canseco (1986)
Mark McGwire (1987)
Walt Weiss (1988)
Ben Grieve (1998)
Bobby Crosby (2004)
Huston Street (2005)
Andrew Bailey (2009)

American League Manager of the Year
See: Manager of the Year Award
Tony La Russa  (1988, 1992)
Bob Melvin (2012, 2018)

American League Gold Glove Award
Pitcher
Mike Norris (1980, 1981)

Catcher
Sean Murphy (2021)

First base
Vic Power (1958)
Mark McGwire (1990)
Matt Olson (2018, 2019)

Third base
Eric Chavez (2001, 2002, 2003, 2004, 2005, 2006)
Matt Chapman (2018, 2019, 2021)

Shortstop
Alfredo Griffin (1985)

Outfield
Joe Rudi (1974, 1975, 1976)
Dwayne Murphy (1980, 1981, 1982, 1983, 1984, 1985)
Rickey Henderson (1981)
Josh Reddick (2012)

American League Platinum Glove Award
Matt Chapman (Third Base) (2018, 2019)

Wilson Defensive Player of the Year Award

See explanatory note at Atlanta Braves award winners and league leaders.
Team (at all positions)
 (2012)
 (2013)

American League Silver Slugger
First baseman
Mark McGwire (1992, 1996)
Jason Giambi (2001)

Third baseman
Eric Chavez (2002)

Outfield
Rickey Henderson (1981, 1990)
Jose Canseco (1988, 1990, 1991)

Edgar Martínez Award
See: Edgar Martínez Award
Dave Kingman (1984)
Dave Parker (1989)
Khris Davis (2018)

Mariano Rivera AL Reliever of the Year Award
See: Major League Baseball Reliever of the Year Award
Liam Hendriks (2020)

Rolaids Relief Man Award
See: Rolaids Relief Man Award
Dennis Eckersley (1988, 1992)
Billy Koch (2002)
Keith Foulke (2003)

MLB All-Century Team (1999)
See: MLB All-Century Team
Ty Cobb, outfielder (1927–1928)
Lefty Grove, pitcher (1925–1933)
Mark McGwire, first baseman (1986–1997)

DHL Hometown Heroes (2006)
See: DHL Hometown Heroes
Reggie Jackson (1967–1975, 1987) (winner)
Dennis Eckersley (1987–1995) (nominee)
Lefty Grove (1925–1933) (nominee)
Rickey Henderson (1979–1984, 1989–1993, 1994–1995, 1998) (nominee)
Catfish Hunter (1965–1974) (nominee)

MLB All-Time Team (1997; Baseball Writers' Association of America)
See: MLB All-Time Team
Harold Baines, designated hitter (1990–1992) (runner-up)
Ty Cobb, center fielder (1927–1928) (runner-up)
Dennis Eckersley, relief pitcher (1987–1995) (runner-up)
Jimmie Foxx, first baseman (1925–1935) (runner-up)
Joe Morgan, second baseman (1984) (runner-up)

Baseball Prospectus "Internet Baseball Awards" Team of the Decade (1999)

Reliever of the Decade: Dennis Eckersley, Athletics–Cardinals–Red Sox
First Base: Mark McGwire, Athletics–Cardinals
2001 Most Valuable Player, AL: Jason Giambi
2005 Rookie of the Year, AL: Huston Street

Chuck Tanner Major League Baseball Manager of the Year Award

Bob Melvin (2012)

Babe Ruth Award (World Series)
See: Babe Ruth Award
Gene Tenace (1972)
Bert Campaneris (1973)
Dick Green (1974)
Dave Stewart (1989)

Topps All-Star Rookie Teams
See: Topps All-Star Rookie Teams
1961: Dick Howser, shortstop
1962: Ed Charles, third baseman & Manny Jiménez, outfielder
1964: Bert Campaneris, shortstop
1966: Jim Nash, right-handed pitcher
1967: Rick Monday, outfielder
1971: Ángel Mangual, outfielder
1974: Claudell Washington, outfielder
1977: Wayne Gross, third baseman & Mitchell Page, outfielder
1978: Dave Revering, first baseman & John Johnson, left-handed pitcher
1983: Bob Kearney, catcher
1986: José Canseco, outfielder
1987: Mark McGwire, first baseman
1988: Walt Weiss, shortstop
1996: Tony Batista, second baseman
1998: A. J. Hinch, catcher & Ben Grieve, outfielder
2000: Terrence Long, outfielder
2002: Mark Ellis, second baseman
2005: Dan Johnson, first baseman & Huston Street, right-handed pitcher
2008: Brad Ziegler, right-handed pitcher
2012: Yoenis Céspedes, outfielder

Baseball America Major League Executive of the Year
See: Baseball America Major League Executive of the Year
 – Billy Beane

Team award
 – American League pennant
 – American League pennant
 – World Series championship
 – World Series championship
 – World Series championship
 – American League pennant
 – World Series championship
 – World Series championship
 – American League pennant
 – World Series Trophy
 – World Series Trophy
 – World Series Trophy
 – Baseball America Organization of the Year
1988 – William Harridge Trophy (American League champion)
 – Commissioner's Trophy (World Series)
 – William Harridge Trophy (American League champion)
 – Baseball America Organization of the Year

Team records (single-game, single-season, career)

Minor-league system

MiLB Overall Minor League Hitter of the Year

2009 – Chris Carter

Organizational Player and Pitcher of the Year

Other achievements

National Baseball Hall of Fame
See: Oakland Athletics#Hall of Famers

California Sports Hall of Fame

Athletics in the Bay Area Sports Hall of Fame
See: Oakland Athletics#Athletics in the Bay Area Sports Hall of Fame

Athletics in the Philadelphia Baseball Wall of Fame
See: Oakland Athletics#Philadelphia Baseball Wall of Fame

Retired numbers
See: Oakland Athletics#Retired numbers

Catfish Hunter Award
See footnote and Catfish Hunter
The award is given to the Athletics' most inspirational player.

Sporting News Sportsman of the Year
See: Sporting News#Sportsman of the Year
1972: Charlie Finley

Ford C. Frick Award recipients
See: Oakland Athletics#Ford C. Frick Award recipients

Sports Illustrated Top 10 GMs/Executives of the Decade (2009)
See: List of 2009 all-decade Sports Illustrated awards and honors#Top 10 GMs/Executives of the Decade
No. 10 – Billy Beane (the list's only other MLB GMs were Boston's Theo Epstein, No. 3, and Seattle and Philadelphia's Pat Gillick, No. 7)

American League Statistical Batting Leaders

Batting Average
Nap Lajoie .426 (1901) (Modern Major League Record)
Al Simmons .381 (1930)
Al Simmons .390 (1931)
Jimmie Foxx .356 (1933)
Ferris Fain .344 (1951)
Ferris Fain .327 (1952)

On-base Percentage
Nap Lajoie .463 (1901)
Topsy Hartsel .409 (1905)
Topsy Hartsel .405 (1907)
Jimmie Foxx .463 (1929)
Mickey Cochrane .459 (1933)
Ferris Fain .438 (1952)
Rickey Henderson .439 (1990)
Mark McGwire .467 (1996)
Jason Giambi .476 (2000)
Jason Giambi .477 (2001)

Slugging Percentage
Nap Lajoie .643 (1901)
Jimmie Foxx .749 (1932)
Jimmie Foxx .703 (1933)
Jimmie Foxx .636 (1935)
Reggie Jackson .608 (1969)
Reggie Jackson .531 (1973)
Mark McGwire .618 (1987)
José Canseco .569 (1988)
Mark McGwire .585 (1992)
Mark McGwire .730 (1996)
Jason Giambi .660 (2001)

OPS
Nap Lajoie 1.106 (1901)
Jimmie Foxx 1.218 (1932)
Jimmie Foxx 1.152 (1933)
Jimmie Foxx 1.097 (1935)
Reggie Jackson 1.018 (1969)
Reggie Jackson .914 (1973)
Rickey Henderson 1.016 (1990)
Mark McGwire 1.197 (1996)
Jason Giambi 1.137 (2001)

Games
George Burns 130 (1918) Co-Leader
Jimmie Dykes 155 (1921)
Chick Galloway 155 (1922) Co-Leader
Bing Miller 154 (1930) Co-Leader
Frankie Hayes 155 (1944) Co-Leader
Dave Philley 157 (1953)
Norm Siebern 162 (1962) Co-Leader
Sal Bando 162 (1968) Co-Leader
Sal Bando 162 (1969) Co-Leader
Sal Bando 162 (1973) Co-Leader
Sal Bando 160 (1975) Co-Leader
Phil Garner 160 (1975) Co-Leader
Tony Armas 109 (1981) Co-Leader
Terrence Long 162 (2001) Co-Leader
Miguel Tejada 162 (2001) Co-Leader
Terrence Long 162 (2002) Co-Leader
Miguel Tejada 162 (2002) Co-Leader

At Bats
Al Simmons 654 (1925)
Al Simmons 670 (1932)
Doc Cramer 661 (1933)
Doc Cramer 649 (1934)
Doc Cramer 644 (1935)
Lou Finney 653 (1936)
Bert Campaneris 642 (1968)
Bert Campaneris 625 (1972)

Runs
Nap Lajoie 145 (1901)
Dave Fultz 109 (1902) Co-Leader
Topsy Hartsel 109 (1902) Co-Leader
Harry Davis 93 (1905)
Eddie Collins 137 (1912)
Eddie Collins 125 (1913)
Eddie Collins 122 (1914)
Al Simmons 152 (1930)
Jimmie Foxx 151 (1932)
Reggie Jackson 123 (1969)
Reggie Jackson 99 (1973)
Rickey Henderson 89 (1981)
Rickey Henderson 119 (1990)

Hits
Nap Lajoie 232 (1901)
George Burns 178 (1918)
Al Simmons 253 (1925)
Al Simmons 216 (1932)
Bert Campaneris 177 (1968)
Joe Rudi 181 (1972)
Rickey Henderson 135 (1981)

Total Bases
Nap Lajoie 350 (1901)
George Burns 236 (1918)
Al Simmons 392 (1925)
Al Simmons 373 (1929)
Jimmie Foxx 438 (1932)
Jimmie Foxx 403 (1933)
Sal Bando 295 (1973) Co-Leader
Joe Rudi 287 (1974)

Doubles
Nap Lajoie 48 (1901)
Harry Davis 43 (1902) Co-Leader
Socks Seybold 45 (1903)
Harry Davis 47 (1905)
Harry Davis 35 (1907)
Eric McNair 47 (1932)
Ferris Fain 43 (1952)
Sal Bando 32 (1973) Co-Leader
Joe Rudi 39 (1974)
Jason Giambi 47 (2001)

Triples
Frank Baker 19 (1909)
Harry Simpson 11 (1956) Co-Leader
Gino Cimoli 15 (1962)
Bert Campaneris 12 (1965) Co-Leader
Joe Rudi 9 (1972) Co-Leader

Home Runs
Nap Lajoie 14 (1901)
Socks Seybold 16 (1902)
Harry Davis 10 (1904)
Harry Davis 8 (1905)
Harry Davis 12 (1906)
Harry Davis 8 (1907)
Home Run Baker 11 (1911)
Home Run Baker 10 (1912) Co-Leader
Home Run Baker 12 (1913)
Home Run Baker 9 (1914)
Tilly Walker 11 (1918) Co-Leader
Jimmie Foxx 58 (1932)
Jimmie Foxx 48 (1933)
Jimmie Foxx 36 (1935) Co-Leader
Gus Zernial 33 (1951)
Reggie Jackson 32 (1973)
Reggie Jackson 36 (1975) Co-Leader
Tony Armas 22 (1981) Co-Leader
Mark McGwire 49 (1987)
José Canseco 42 (1988)
José Canseco 44 (1991) Co-Leader
Mark McGwire 52 (1996)
Khris Davis 48 (2018)

RBI
Nap Lajoie 125 (1901)
Harry Davis 83 (1905)
Harry Davis 96 (1906)
Frank Baker 130 (1912)
Frank Baker 117 (1912)
Al Simmons 157 (1929)
Jimmie Foxx 169 (1932)
Jimmie Foxx 163 (1933)
Reggie Jackson 117 (1973)
José Canseco 124 (1988)

Walks
Topsy Hartsel 87 (1902)
Topsy Hartsel 121 (1905)
Topsy Hartsel 88 (1906)
Topsy Hartsel 106 (1907)
Topsy Hartsel 93 (1908)
Max Bishop 128 (1929)
Jimmie Foxx 111 (1934)
Gene Tenace 110 (1974)
Rickey Henderson 116 (1982)
Rickey Henderson 103 (1983)
Mark McGwire 110 (1990)
Rickey Henderson 118 (1998)
Jason Giambi 137 (2000)
Jason Giambi 129 (2001)
Eric Chavez 95 (2004)
Daric Barton 110 (2010)

Strikeouts
Jimmie Dykes 98 (1922)
Jimmie Foxx 70 (1929)
Jimmie Foxx 66 (1930) Co-Leader
Jimmie Foxx 84 (1931)
Jimmie Foxx 93 (1933)
Jimmie Foxx 99 (1935)
Sam Chapman 96 (1940)
Eddie Joost 110 (1947)
Nelson Mathews 143 (1964)
Reggie Jackson 171 (1968)
Reggie Jackson 142 (1969)
Reggie Jackson 135 (1970)
Reggie Jackson 161 (1971)
Tony Armas 115 (1981)

Stolen Bases
Topsy Hartsel 47 (1902)
Danny Hoffman 46 (1905)
Eddie Collins 81 (1910)
Billy Werber 35 (1937) Co-Leader
Bert Campaneris 51 (1965)
Bert Campaneris 52 (1966)
Bert Campaneris 55 (1967)
Bert Campaneris 62 (1968)
Bert Campaneris 42 (1970)
Bert Campaneris 52 (1972)
Billy North 54 (1974)
Billy North 75 (1976)
Rickey Henderson 100 (1980)
Rickey Henderson 56 (1981)
Rickey Henderson 130 (1982)
Rickey Henderson 108 (1983)
Rickey Henderson 66 (1984)
Rickey Henderson 65 (1990)
Rickey Henderson 58 (1991)
Rickey Henderson 66 (1998)
Coco Crisp 49 (2011) Co-Leader

Singles
Nap Lajoie 156 (1901)
Eddie Collins 145 (1913)
Stuffy McInnis 160 (1914)
George Burns 141 (1918)
Doc Cramer 158 (1934)
Doc Cramer 170 (1935)
Irv Hall 139 (1945)
Bert Campaneris 139 (1968)

Runs Created
Nap Lajoie 158 (1901)
Al Simmons 164 (1925)
Jimmie Foxx 149 (1929) Co-Leader
Jimmie Foxx 206 (1932)
Jimmie Foxx 181 (1933)
Norm Siebern 123 (1962)
Jason Giambi 162 (2001)

Extra-Base Hits
Nap Lajoie 76 (1901)
Harry Davis 61 (1905)
Harry Davis 61 (1906)
Al Simmons 79 (1925) Co-Leader
Al Simmons 84 (1929)
Jimmie Foxx 100 (1932)
Jimmie Foxx 94 (1933)
Reggie Jackson 86 (1969)
Sal Bando 64 (1973)
Joe Rudi 65 (1974)
Reggie Jackson 78 (1975)
Tony Armas 49 (1981)
José Canseco 76 (1988)
Jason Giambi 87 (2001) Co-Leader

Times on Base
Nap Lajoie 269 (1901)
Topsy Hartsel 270 (1905)
Eddie Collins 284 (1914)
Jimmie Foxx 329 (1932)
Jimmie Foxx 301 (1933)
Ferris Fain 282 (1952)
Norm Siebern 296 (1962)
Wayne Causey 265 (1964)
Rickey Henderson 301 (1980)
Jason Giambi 320 (2001)

Hit By Pitch
Eddie Murphy 12 (1914) Co-Leader
Wally Schang 9 (1917) Co-Leader
George Burns 8 (1918) Co-Leader
George Burns 12 (1919)
Bing Miller 8 (1928)
Jimmie Dykes 7 (1929)
Jimmie Dykes 10 (1930)
Bing Miller 10 (1931)
Bobby Del Greco 13 (1962) Co-Leader
Bert Campaneris 9 (1965) Co-Leader
Don Baylor 20 (1976)

Sacrifice Hits
Dave Fultz 35 (1902)
Mule Haas 33 (1930)
Mule Haas 19 (1931)
Mule Haas 27 (1932)
Eddie Joost 24 (1947)
Barney McCosky 22 (1948)
Bert Campaneris 20 (1972)
Dwayne Murphy 22 (1980)
Mike Gallego 17 (1990) Co-Leader
Jerry Browne 16 (1992)

Sacrifice Flies
Héctor López 9 (1958) Co-Leader
Leo Posada 12 (1961) Co-Leader
Mike Hershberger 7 (1966) Co-Leader
Sal Bando 13 (1974)
Dave Kingman 14 (1984)

Intentional Walks
Reggie Jackson 20 (1969) Co-Leader
Reggie Jackson 20 (1974)

Grounded into Double Plays
Frankie Hayes 23 (1941) Co-Leader
Pete Suder 23 (1941) Co-Leader
George Kell 28 (1944)
Sam Chapman 22 (1946)
Billy Hitchcock 30 (1950)
Dave Philley 29 (1952)
Héctor López 23 (1958)
Ben Grieve 32 (2000)
Jason Kendall 27 (2005)

At Bats per Strikeout
Ed Busch 46.2 (1945)
Carney Lansford 22.0 (1989)
Jason Kendall 15.4 (2005)

At Bats per Home Run
Socks Seybold 32.6 (1902)
Harry Davis 40.4 (1904)
Harry Davis 75.9 (1905)
Harry Davis 45.9 (1906)
Harry Davis 72.8 (1907)
Frank Baker 53.8 (1911)
Frank Baker 57.7 (1912)
Frank Baker 47.0 (1913)
Jimmie Foxx 10.1 (1932)
Jimmie Foxx 11.9 (1933)
Jimmie Foxx 14.9 (1935)
Gus Zernial 13.2 (1953)
Gus Zernial 13.8 (1955)
Reggie Jackson 16.8 (1973)
Mark McGwire 11.4 (1987)
José Canseco 14.5 (1988)
Mark McGwire 14.8 (1989)
José Canseco 13.0 (1991)
Mark McGwire 11.1 (1992)
Mark McGwire 8.1 (1995)
Mark McGwire 8.1 (1996)

Outs
Doc Cramer 491 (1933)
Irv Hall 484 (1945)
Ed Charles 484 (1963)
Bert Campaneris 520 (1972)
Rubén Sierra 515 (1993)

American League Statistical Pitching Leaders

ERA
Rube Waddell 1.48 (1905)
Harry Krause 1.39 (1909)
Lefty Grove 2.51 (1926)
Lefty Grove 2.81 (1929)
Lefty Grove 2.54 (1930)
Lefty Grove 2.06 (1931)
Lefty Grove 2.84 (1932)
Diego Segui 2.56 (1970)
Vida Blue 1.82 (1971)
Catfish Hunter 2.49 (1974)
Steve Ontiveros 2.65 (1994)

Wins
Rube Waddell 27 (1905)
Jack Coombs 31 (1910)
Jack Coombs 28 (1911)
Eddie Rommel 27 (1922)
Eddie Rommel 21 (1925) Co-Leader
Lefty Grove 24 (1928) Co-Leader
George Earnshaw 24 (1929)
Lefty Grove 28 (1930)
Lefty Grove 31 (1931)
Lefty Grove 24 (1933) Co-Leader
Bobby Shantz 24 (1952)
Catfish Hunter 25 (1974) Co-Leader
Steve McCatty 14 (1981) Co-Leader
Dave Stewart 20 (1987) Co-Leader
Bob Welch 27 (1990)
Tim Hudson 20 (2000) Co-Leader
Mark Mulder 21 (2001)
Barry Zito 23 (2002)

Won-Loss Percentage
Rube Waddell .730 (1905)
Eddie Plank .760 (1906)
Chief Bender .821 (1910)
Chief Bender .773 (1911)
Chief Bender .850 (1914)
Eddie Rommel .786 (1927)
Eddie Rommel .857 (1929)
Lefty Grove .848 (1930)
Lefty Grove .886 (1931)
Lefty Grove .750 (1933)
Bobby Shantz .774 (1952)
Dave Wickersham .733 (1962)
Bob Welch .818 (1990)
Tim Hudson .769 (2000)

WHIP
Lefty Grove 1.144 (1930)
Lefty Grove 1.077 (1931)
Lefty Grove 1.193 (1932)
Bobby Shantz 1.048 (1952)
Vida Blue .952 (1971)
Catfish Hunter .986 (1974)
Steve Ontiveros 1.032 (1994)

Hits Allowed/9IP
Rube Waddell 6.33 (1905)
Jimmy Dygert 6.88 (1907)
Lefty Grove 7.92 (1926)
George Earnshaw 8.23 (1929)
Vida Blue 6.03 (1971)
Mike Norris 6.81 (1980)
Steve McCatty 6.79 (1981)

Walks/9IP
Chief Bender 1.74 (1912)
Bob Hasty 2.01 (1921)
Jack Quinn 1.65 (1927)
Eddie Rommel 1.35 (1928)
Lum Harris 1.34 (1944)
Bobby Shantz 2.03 (1952)
Gil Heredia 1.53 (1999)

Strikeouts/9IP
Rube Waddell 6.84 (1902)
Rube Waddell 8.39 (1903)
Rube Waddell 8.20 (1904)
Rube Waddell 7.86 (1905)
Rube Waddell 6.47 (1906)
Rube Waddell 7.33 (1907)
Lefty Grove 5.30 (1925)
Lefty Grove 6.77 (1926)
Lefty Grove 5.97 (1927)
George Earnshaw 6.65 (1928)
Lefty Grove 5.56 (1929)
Lefty Grove 6.46 (1930)
Lou Brissie 5.89 (1948)
Vida Blue 8.68 (1971)

Games
Eddie Plank 43 (1903)
Rube Waddell 46 (1905)
Jack Coombs 45 (1910)
Eddie Rommel 51 (1922)
Eddie Rommel 56 (1923)
Lefty Grove 50 (1930)
Joe Berry 52 (1945)
John Wyatt 81 (1964)
Rollie Fingers 76 (1974)
Rollie Fingers 75 (1975)
Bob Lacey 74 (1978)
Buddy Groom 76 (1999) Co-Leader
Billy Koch 84 (2002)

Saves
Chief Bender 3 (1906)Co-Leader
Eddie Plank 4 (1911) Co-Leader
Chief Bender 13 (1913)
Lefty Grove 9 (1930)
Joe Berry 12 (1944) Co-Leader
Jack Aker 32 (1966)
Dennis Eckersley 45 (1988)
Dennis Eckersley 51 (1992)
Keith Foulke 43 (2003)

Innings
Scott Perry  (1918)
Rube Walberg 291 (1931)
Rick Langford 290 (1980)
Dave Stewart  (1988)
Dave Stewart 267 (1990)

Strikeouts
Rube Waddell 210 (1902)
Rube Waddell 302 (1903)
Rube Waddell 349 (1904)
Rube Waddell 287 (1905)
Rube Waddell 196 (1906)
Rube Waddell 232 (1907)
Lefty Grove 116 (1925)
Lefty Grove 194 (1926)
Lefty Grove 174 (1927)
Lefty Grove 183 (1928)
Lefty Grove 170 (1929)
Lefty Grove 209 (1930)
Lefty Grove 175 (1931)

Games Started
Eddie Plank 40 (1903)
Eddie Plank 41 (1905) Co-Leader
Jack Coombs 40 (1911)
Scott Perry 36 (1918)
Slim Harriss 33 (1925) Co-Leader
Lefty Grove 37 (1929) Co-Leader
George Earnshaw 39 (1930)
George Caster 40 (1938) Co-Leader
Harry Byrd 37 (1953)
Chuck Dobson 40 (1970) Co-Leader
Catfish Hunter 40 (1970) Co-Leader
Chris Codiroli 37 (1985)  Co-Leader
Dave Stewart 37 (1988)
Dave Stewart 36 (1989) Co-Leader
Dave Stewart 36 (1990) Co-Leader
Dave Stewart 35 (1991) Co-Leader
Bob Welch 35 (1991) Co-Leader
Mike Moore 36 (1992) Co-Leader
Ron Darling 25 (1994) Co-Leader
Tim Hudson 35 (2001) Co-Leader
Barry Zito 35 (2001) Co-Leader
Barry Zito 35 (2002)
Barry Zito 35 (2005) Co-Leader
Danny Haren 34 (2006) Co-Leader
Barry Zito 34 (2006) Co-Leader

Complete Games
Rube Waddell 34 (1903) Co-Leader
Eddie Plank 35 (1905) Co-Leader
Scott Perry 30 (1918) Co-Leader
Lefty Grove 27 (1931) Co-Leader
Lefty Grove 27 (1932)
Lefty Grove 21 (1933)
Rick Langford 28 (1980)
Rick Langford 18 (1981)
Dave Stewart 14 (1988) Co-Leader
Dave Stewart 11 (1990) Co=Leader
Mark Mulder 9 (2003) Co-Leader
Mark Mulder 5 (2004) Co-Leader

Shutouts
Eddie Plank 8 (1907)
Jack Coombs 13 (1910)
Eddie Plank 6 (1911 Co-Leader
George Earnshaw 3 (1930) Co-Leader
Lefty Grove 4 (1931)
Lefty Grove 4 (1932)
Chuck Dobson 5 (1970) Co-Leader
Vida Blue 8 (1971)
Steve McCatty 4 (1981) Co-Leader
Dave Stewart 4 (1990) Co-Leader
Mark Mulder 4 (2001)
Tim Hudson 2 (2003) Co-Leader
Mark Mulder 2 (2003) Co-Leader
Tim Hudson 2 (2004) Co-Leader

Home Runs Allowed
Eddie Rommel 21 (1921) Co-Leader
Rube Walberg 18 (1927) Co-Leader
Rube Walberg 22 (1929) Co-Leader
George Earnshaw 28 (1932)
Gordon Rhodes 26 (1936)
Lynn Nelson 27 (1939) Co-Leader
Orlando Peña 40 (1964)
Catfish Hunter 39 (1973)
Matt Keough 38 (1982)

Walks Allowed
Chick Fraser 132 (1901)
Jimmy Dygert 97 (1908)
Cy Morgan 117 (1910)
Weldon Wyckoff 165 (1915)
Elmer Myers 168 (1916)
Lefty Grove 131 (1925)
George Earnshaw 125 (1929)
George Earnshaw 139 (1930)
Phil Marchildon 140 (1942)
Phil Marchildon 141 (1947)
Todd Van Poppel 89 (1994) Co-Leader
Kevin Appier 102 (2000)

Hits Allowed
Jack Coombs 360 (1911)
Scott Perry 295 (1918)
Vida Blue 284 (1977) Co-Leader
Dave Stewart 260 (1989)

Strikeout to Walk
Rube Waddell 3.28 (1902)
Chief Bender 6.58 (1909)
Lefty Grove 1.92 (1926)
Lefty Grove 2.86 (1928)
Lefty Grove 2.10 (1929)
Lefty Grove 3.48 (1930)
Lefty Grove 2.82 (1931)
Lefty Grove 2.38 (1932)
Bobby Shantz 2.41 (1952)

Losses
Weldon Wyckoff 22 (1915)
Bullet Joe Bush 24 (1916)
Scott Perry 19 (1918)
Scott Perry 25 (1920)
Eddie Rommel 23 (1921)
Slim Harriss 20 (1922)
Eddie Rommel 19 (1923) Co-Leader
Gordon Rhodes 20 (1936)
Harry Kelley 21 (1937)
George Caster 20 (1938)
George Caster 19 (1940) Co-Leader
Lum Harris 21 (1943)
Bobo Newsom 20 (1945)
Dick Fowler 16 (1946) Co-Leader
Lou Knerr 16 (1946) Co-Leader
Phil Marchildon 16 (1946) Co-Leader
Alex Kellner 20 (1950)
Alex Kellner 14 (1951) Co-Leader
Harry Byrd 20 (1953)
Art Ditmar 22 (1956)
Ed Rakow 17 (1962) Co-Leader
Orlando Peña 20 (1963)
Diego Segui 17 (1964)
John O'Donoghue 18 (1965) Co-Leader
Vida Blue 19 (1977) Co-Leader
Rick Langford 19 (1977) Co-Leader
Brian Kingman 20 (1980)
Matt Keough 18 (1982) Co-Leader
Tom Candiotti 16 (1998) Co-Leader

Earned Runs Allowed
Jack Coombs 132 (1911)
Weldon Wyckoff 108 (1915)
Elmer Myers 128 (1916)
Elmer Myers 99 (1917)
Willie Adams 83 (1918)
George Earnshaw 146 (1930)
Nels Potter 144 (1939)
Lum Harris 101 (1943)
Bobo Newsom 94 (1945)
Lou Brissie 109 (1949) Co-Leader
Alex Kellner 137 (1950)
Alex Kellner 112 (1952)
Harry Byrd 145 (1953)
Arnie Portocarrero 112 (1954)
Art Ditmar 125 (1956)
Bud Daley 117 (1960)
Ed Rakow 111 (1962)
Catfish Hunter 87 (1968)
Vida Blue 119 (1977) Co-Leader
Matt Keough 133 (1982) Co-Leader
Dave Stewart 130 (1991)

Wild Pitches
Eddie Plank 13 (1901) Co-Leader
Rube Waddell 9 (1903)
Weldon Wyckoff 14 (1914) Co-Leader
Weldon Wyckoff 14 (1915)
Bullet Joe Bush 15 (1916)
Roy Moore 9 (1921)
Roy Meeker 7 (1924) Co-Leader
Lefty Grove 9 (1925)
George Earnshaw 7 (1928) Co-Leader
George Earnshaw 9 (1932)
Stu Flythe 16 (1936)
George Turbeville 9 (1937)
Porter Vaughan 12 (1940) Co-Leader
Phil Marchildon 12 (1941)
Phil Marchildon 13 (1942)
Lum Harris 8 (1943)
Carl Scheib 9 (1950)
Alex Kellner 9 (1951)
Alex Kellner 10 (1953)
Arnie Portocarrero 9 (1954)
Blue Moon Odom 17 (1968) Co-Leader
Rick Langford 16 (1979)
Mike Norris 14 (1981)
Storm Davis 16 (1988) Co-Leader
Mike Moore 22 (1992)

Hit Batsmen
Chick Fraser 32 (1901)
Eddie Plank 18 (1902)
Chief Bender 25 (1903)
Eddie Plank 24 (1905)
Cy Morgan 18 (1910) Co-Leader
Cy Morgan 21 (1911)
Willie Adams 12 (1918)
Howard Ehmke 14 (1927)
Whitey Wilshere 10 (1935)
Russ Christopher 9 (1944)
Phil Marchildon 7 (1947) Co-Leader
Harry Byrd 14 (1953)

Batters Faced
Eddie Plank 1,378 (1903)
Scott Perry 1,342 (1918)
Eddie Rommel 1,154 (1925)
George Earnshaw 1,299 (1930)
Rube Walberg 1,248 (1931)
Dave Stewart 1,156 (1988)
Dave Stewart 1,081 (1989)
Dave Stewart 1,088 (1990)
Barry Zito 945 (2006)

Games Finished
Rube Vickers 17 (1908)
Walt Kinney 21 (1919)
Eddie Smith 27 (1938)
Joe Berry 47 (1944)
Joe Berry 40 (1945)
Jack Aker 57 (1966)
Rollie Fingers 59 (1975)
Dennis Eckersley 65 (1992)
Billy Koch 79 (2002)
Keith Foulke 67 (2003)

Oldest Player
Harry Davis 41 (1915)
Harry Davis 42 (1916)
Harry Davis 43 (1917)
Jack Quinn 43 (1927)
Jack Quinn 44 (1928)
Jack Quinn 46 (1930)
Bob Boyd 41 (1961)
Satchel Paige 58 (1965)
Doug Jones 43 (2000)

Youngest Player

Chief Bender 19 (1903)
Eddie Collins 19 (1906)
Stuffy McInnis 18 (1909)
Herb Pennock 18 (1912)
Ben Rochefort 17 (1914)
Lew Malone 18 (1915)
Charlie Grimm 17 (1916)
Walter Anderson 19 (1917)
William Pierson 19 (1918)
Lena Styles 19 (1919)
Emmett McCann 18 (1920)
Jimmie Foxx 17 (1925)
Jimmie Foxx 18 (1926)
Lew Krausse, Sr. 19 (1931)
Frankie Hayes 18 (1933)
Carl Scheib 16 (1943)
Carl Scheib 17 (1944)
Alex George 16 (1955)
Lou Klimchock 18 (1958)
Lew Krausse Jr. 18 (1961)
Dave Duncan 18 (1964)
Tim Conroy 18 (1978)
Todd Van Poppel 19 (1991)
Miguel Tejada 21 (1997)

See also
Baseball awards
List of Major League Baseball awards

Footnotes

Award
Major League Baseball team trophies and awards